Gorriti Island is a small island near the shores of Punta del Este, Uruguay.

History

Discovered in 1516 by Juan Díaz de Solís, it was settled from the 18th century, when in the face of Portuguese influence it was of some military significance, and abandoned cannons are still left.

Gorriti Island forms part of the Maldonado Department.

Declared a National Heritage

Along with Isla de Lobos, the island has been declared to be a National Heritage, attracting tourists on beaches annually. Surrounding waters are rich in wildlife both for permanently and seasonally, including southern right whales, southern elephant seals and orcas chasing tunas  or South American sea lions and South American fur seals breed on Isla de Lobos.

See also

 Maldonado Department#History

References

External links

 Gorriti Island

Islands of the Río de la Plata
Punta del Este
River islands of Uruguay